Garniga Terme (Garniga  in local dialect) is a comune (municipality) in Trentino in the northern Italian region Trentino-Alto Adige/Südtirol, located about  southwest of Trento.

Garniga Terme borders the following municipalities: Trento, Cimone and Aldeno.

Demographic evolution

References

Cities and towns in Trentino-Alto Adige/Südtirol
Spa towns in Italy